United Nations General Assembly Resolution 40/50, entitled Question of Western Sahara, is a resolution of the United Nations General Assembly about the situation in Western Sahara, which was adopted on 2 December 1985 at the 40th session of the General Assembly.

Draft Resolution 
On 2 December 1985, the United Nations General Assembly adopted resolution A/RES/40/50 by a recorded vote of 96 in favour to 7 against, with 39 abstentions and 17 countries not voting. The table below shows voting results by country:

See also
National Question

References 

1985 in international relations
1985 documents
United Nations General Assembly resolutions concerning Western Sahara
National questions